Abdúl Aramayo (2 September 1934 – 2 September 2020) was a Bolivian footballer. He played in four matches for the Bolivia national football team in 1963. He was also part of Bolivia's squad that won the 1963 South American Championship.

References

External links
 

1934 births
2020 deaths
Bolivian footballers
Bolivia international footballers
Place of birth missing
Association football midfielders
Chaco Petrolero players
Club Bolívar players
Club Always Ready players